The Negeri Sembilan State Mosque is Negeri Sembilan's state mosque. It is located at Jalan Datuk Hamzah near the lake gardens in Seremban, Malaysia.

History
The mosque was constructed between 1965 and 1967. This mosque was officially opened on 24 November 1967 by the late Yang di-Pertuan Besar of Negeri Sembilan, Almarhum Tuanku Jaafar ibni Almarhum Tuanku Abdul Rahman.

Architecture
The mosque exhibits a blend of Modernist and traditional Minangkabau elements in its architectural design, of which it was credited to Malayan Architects Co-Partnership, led by Chen Voon Fee, Lim Chong Keat, and William SW Lim. It was later taken over by Dato’ Ar. Dr Hj. Baharuddin Abu Kassim, who joined Jurubena Bertiga International Partnership in 1966. The nine pillars surrounding the mosque's circumference signifies the nine chiefdoms or luaks that formed the original confederacy (see Negeri Sembilan#History ).

See also

 Islam in Malaysia

Mosques in Negeri Sembilan
Buildings and structures in Seremban
Mosques completed in 1967
1967 establishments in Malaysia